Endostemon is a genus of plants in the family Lamiaceae, first described in 1910. It is native primarily to eastern Africa, with some species in central and southern Africa, the Arabian Peninsula, Madagascar, and the Indian subcontinent.

Species
Endostemon albus A.J.Paton, Harley & M.M.Harley - Kenya, Tanzania, Mozambique
Endostemon camporum (Gürke) M.R.Ashby - Kenya, Tanzania
Endostemon ctenoneurus Harley - Kenya, Somalia
Endostemon glandulosus Harley & Sebsebe - Ethiopia
Endostemon gracilis (Benth.) M.R.Ashby - Kenya, Somalia, Tanzania, Yemen
Endostemon kelleri (Briq.) Ryding ex A.J.Paton & Harley - Kenya, Somalia, Ethiopia
Endostemon leucosphaerus (Briq.) A.J.Paton, Harley & M.M.Harley - Somalia, Ethiopia
Endostemon membranaceus (Benth.) Ayob. ex A.J.Paton & Harley - Cameroon, Angola, Central African Republic
Endostemon obbiadensis (Chiov.) M.R.Ashby - Somalia
Endostemon obtusifolius (E.Mey.) N.E.Br.  - from South Africa north to Angola and Tanzania
Endostemon racemosus Ryding, A.J.Paton & Thulin - Somalia
Endostemon stenocaulis (Hedge) Ryding, A.J.Paton & Thulin - Somalia
Endostemon tenuiflorus (Benth.) M.R.Ashby - eastern + southern Africa, Madagascar, Arabian Peninsula
Endostemon tereticaulis (Poir.) M.R.Ashby - widespread across much of tropical Africa, also Yemen + Saudi Arabia
Endostemon tomentosus Harley & Sebsebe - Somalia
Endostemon tubulascens (Briq.) M.R.Ashby - Angola
Endostemon usambarensis M.R.Ashby - Tanzania
Endostemon villosus (Briq.) M.R.Ashby - central Africa
Endostemon viscosus (Roth) M.R.Ashby - India, Assam, Sri Lanka
Endostemon wakefieldii (Baker) M.R.Ashby - Kenya

References

Lamiaceae
Lamiaceae genera
Taxa named by N. E. Brown